The Soloviev D-30 (now the Aviadvigatel PS-30) is a Soviet two-shaft low-bypass turbofan engine, officially referred to as a "bypass turbojet". It is probably the single most important turbofan engine developed in the Soviet Union. Development of the turbofan spurred numerous growth versions with increased fan diameter and modified component arrangements. Developed in a short period of time (about three years), the D-30 turned out to be one of the most reliable engines in the history of Soviet engine development, and it was recognized with the USSR State Prize.

Design and development
The original version of the Soloviev D-30 was developed specifically to power the Tupolev Tu-134 short-to-medium range jet airliner; however, it also served as a base for the development of a family of advanced engines. Engine development was started in the early 60s. Nevertheless, by 1966, the engine was put into serial production.

The D-30 engine has a two-stage compression spool, a cannular combustion chamber and a 4-stage turbine, and was the first Soviet-built engine to use cooled turbine blades. The turbine was manufactured using the newest heat-resistant material of the time, along with an exhaust nozzle with a lobe mixer. The technical and efficiency parameters of the D-30 were competitive and similar to those of the Western engines of that period.

In 1969, an upgraded version, the D-30 engine series II, was created - the main difference being the addition of a thrust reverser and an improved control system. The engine was produced in 1970 through 1987 and was used on the Tu-134FA, Tu-134B, and Tu-134AK aircraft.

In 1980, the D-30 engine series III, a further improvement, was created with the maximum thrust of 6930 kgf (with preserving it at up to до = +C). The number of the engine compressor stages was increased to 5, the gas dynamic stability margin was improved, the system was introduced that protected against engine over-speed and gas temperature overheating. The D-30 engine of the third series was produced between 1983-1993. These engines were installed on the Tu-134-A-3, Tu-134B-3, and Tu-134UB-L passenger airliners. The core of the third-series D-30 was also taken as a base point for developing gas turbine plants for the Russian fuel and energy complex.

The Soloviev D-30 was produced in various modifications at the Perm Engine Plant (now JSC UEC-PM). In total, there were about 3000 units of D-30 engines (series I to III) manufactured in this engine plant.

Variants

D-30KU
The D-30KU engine is capable of generating 11,000 kgf at takeoff and was developed in 1971 to replace the Kuznetsov NK-8-4 engine on the Il-62 long-haul airliner, which had some difficulties covering intercontinental routes because of its inadequate range. Ilyushin Design Bureau, the aircraft designer, made the decision to power the aircraft with newer engines which have lower specific fuel consumption. In contrast with the base D-30, the D-30KU has increased bypass ratio and higher turbine inlet temperature: its development was comparable to Pratt & Whitney's development of the Pratt & Whitney JT8D-200 series, but with an even greater increase in thrust. The first compressor spool has 3 stages, the second one has 11 stages, the design of the combustion chamber is however similar to that of D-30. The turbine hot section has a total of 6 stages, the nozzle is common for both flows and has a lobe mixer and a mixing chamber. The D-30KU engine was the first aviation engine in the USSR to include a bucket-type thrust reverser. The Il-62M aircraft equipped with D-30KU had a range extended by 1500 km, compared with the basic model equipped with NK-8-4 engines. A total of 1584 D-30KU engines were manufactured by Rybinsk Engine Plant (now PAO NPO UEC-Saturn) under the authorized supervision of the Perm Design Bureau.
D-30KP

Similar to the D-30KU, a new engine variant called D-30KP which delivered 12,000 kgf of thrust was developed for military transport aircraft Il-76. The development was completed by the end of the 60s. In 1971, Il-76MD with the propulsion unit on the basis of four D-30KP was demonstrated to the country’s leaders. In 1972, engine passed certification tests and then was presented to the public at the next international air show in Le Bourget (France). By 1974 the engine was put into service to power not only military Il-76 itself, but also numerous modifications: tanker plane Il-78, “aircraft-hospital” Il-76MD Scalpel, early warning and control aircraft A-50, weightlessness simulator Il-76K, airborne test rig Il-76LL for in-flight tests of the aircraft engines and others. D-30KP was identical to its predecessor D-30KU - both are low bypass turbofan engines. The engine differs only by having a higher gas temperature at the turbine inlet and an increased compressor pressure ratio and bypass ratio. Powered by four D-30KP engines, Il-76 is capable of lifting a payload of 40 tons (88,000 lb) over a range of 5,000 km (2,700 nmi; 3,100 mi) at cruise speed up to 900 km/ hr. D-30KP engines were manufactured in the city of Rybinsk (Yaroslavl region) at Rybinsk Engine Production Plant (now NPO UEC-Saturn). The D-30KP engines production continues till present for military supplies. More than 4700 D-30KP engines have been manufactured in total.

The Chinese Xi'an Y-20 prototype was also powered by four D-30KP-2 engines.
D-30KU-154

The successful replacement of the engines on long-haul Il-62 stimulated the leaders of the Ministry of Aviation Industry in the Soviets to re-engine another popular aircraft – the medium-haul passenger airliner Tu-154. Ultimately, Tu-154M powered by D-30KU-154 was the backbone of the civil aviation industry in the Soviets till the end of the 20th century. The D-30KU-154 engine was developed with a maximum thrust of 10,500 kgf specifically to power the Tu-154. Development started in 1979. Pavel Solovyov used the D-30KU core as a starting point. In the course of designing the D-30KU-154 engine, some of the systems were improved, new components were added, and in 1984 the new engine entered serial production. The replacement of Kuznetsov NK-8 engine with the D-30KU-154 engine on Tu-154 allowed the reduction the fuel consumption by 28%! This ultimately defined the profitability of the air transportations industry in the Soviets for another 15 years. During the years of active operation of D-30KU-154, the manufacturer, Perm design bureau, continued working on improving the engine. A vivid example of that is the development of the noise suppression system with noise-absorbing structures from polymer composite materials. There were in total more than 1500 D-30KU-154 engines manufactured by Rybinsk Engine Plant (now NPO UEC-Saturn).

D-30F-6

In the mid-1970s, the Soviet Union began the search for a high-speed interceptor to supplement and replace its MiG-25. The MiG-25 had two enormously powerful Tumansky R-15 turbojets, allowing Mach 3 speed at high altitudes, but the problem was their weak performance at low altitudes, not even sufficient to cross Mach 1 boundary. More acute problems stemmed from the tendency of the Foxbat's engines to break down at maximum throttle in high-speed situations. A new engine, this time a low-bypass turbofan, was needed to power the new interceptor. The Mikoyan-Gurevich (MiG) design bureau contracted OKB-19 design bureau (now part of Aviadvigatel) to build such an engine, for the aircraft that would become known as the MiG-31.

The Soloviev design bureau came up with the D-30F6 turbofan. These powerful engines also allowed the large and complex interceptor to attain supersonic speeds at low altitudes under .
Data from: Aircraft engines of the World 1970, Jane's all the World's Aircraft 1993–94

Other Variants

D-30V12High-altitude version for the Myasishchev M-55 de-rated to 
D-30F11Engine for experimental twin-engine S-37 (Su-47) prototype
D-21A1Another variant of the two-spool engine with supersonic nozzle intended to power high-altitude supersonic business-jet S-21 from Sukhoi design bureau. Construction scheme is almost the same as for D-30F6 except for the absence of afterburner chamber.
WS-18Chinese reverse engineered copy of imported D-30KP-2.

Applications
 Ilyushin Il-62 jet airliner
 Mikoyan-Gurevich MiG-31 jet interceptor
 Sukhoi Su-47 Berkut (formerly S-37) demonstrator jet fighter
 Tupolev Tu-134 jet airliner
 Tupolev Tu-154 jet airliner
 Ilyushin Il-76 strategic airlifter
 Xian H-6 jet bomber (WS-18)
 Xian Y-20 strategic airlifter (WS-18)

Specifications

See also

References

External links

 D-30F6 description at manufacturer's site

D-30
Low-bypass turbofan engines
1960s turbofan engines